"The Way" is the third single released in 2001 by American R&B/soul singer-songwriter Jill Scott, from her debut album, Who Is Jill Scott? Words and Sounds Vol. 1 on Hidden Beach. The song was her second top 20 hit on Billboard's Hot R&B/Hip-Hop Singles & Tracks chart and peaked at number 60 on the Hot 100 chart.

Charts

Weekly charts

Year-end charts

References

2000 songs
2001 singles
Jill Scott (singer) songs
Songs written by Andre Harris
Song recordings produced by Dre & Vidal
Hidden Beach Recordings singles
Soul ballads
Contemporary R&B ballads
2000s ballads